Arkansas Highway 209 is a designation for two north–south state highways in southeast Arkansas. One segment of  runs in Parkdale from US 165 to Arkansas Highway 8. A segment in Chicot County runs  from US 65 to Highway 8. Neither route has any spur or business routes.

Route description

Parkdale segment
The route begins at Highway 8 and heads north and east through Parkdale. Highway 209 meets US 165 and terminates north of town. The route is named School Avenue in Parkdale, and passes two properties listed on the National Register of Historic Places: the Dr. Robert George Williams House and the Parkdale Baptist Church.

Grand Lake segment
The route begins at US 65 and runs briefly northeast to Highway 8. The route terminates at Highway 8 near the shores of Grand Lake. The route is two-lane undivided for its entire length.

History
Highway 209 began as a route along Grand Lake from Highway 8 south, first numbered on the state highway map in 1959. This route would later be shortened when Highway 8 was extended along its former length, leaving the Highway 209 designation on the connector road only. The route in Parkdale was added to the state highway system in 1975.

Major intersections

Western segment

Eastern segment

See also

 List of state highways in Arkansas

References

External links

209
Transportation in Ashley County, Arkansas
Transportation in Chicot County, Arkansas